Liu Qing (born 28 January 1993) is a taekwondo practitioner from Macau.

References

Asian Games medalists in taekwondo
Taekwondo practitioners at the 2014 Asian Games
1993 births
Asian Games bronze medalists for Macau
Living people
Medalists at the 2014 Asian Games
Taekwondo practitioners at the 2018 Asian Games